Deddy Mizwar (born 5 March 1955) is an Indonesian actor, film director and politician, born of an Indo (Dutch-Betawi) father and Betawi-Bugis mother. He is the Chairman of Indonesia's National Film Advisory Board (Badan Pertimbangan Perfilman Nasional) and former Vice Governor of West Java. He also ran for governorship of the province in the 2018 election. His 2010 film How Funny (This Country Is) was selected as the Indonesian entry for the Best Foreign Language Film at the 83rd Academy Awards, but it didn't make the final shortlist.

Selected filmography
Naga Naga Naga (2021)
Bidadari Mencari Sayap (2020)
Sejuta Sayang Untuknya (2020)
Bangun Lagi Dong Lupus (2013)
How Funny (This Country Is) (2010)
 Ketika Cinta Bertasbih II (2009)
 Ketika Cinta Bertasbih (2009)
 Nagabonar Jadi 2 (2007) (actor and director)
 Ketika (2005) (actor and director)
 Kiamat Sudah Dekat (2003) (actor and director)
 Gema Kampus 66 (1991) (actor)
 Jual Tampang (1990) (actor)
 Irisan-Irisan Hati (1988) (actor)
 Ayahku (1987) (actor)
 Bilur-bilur Penyesalan (1987) (actor)
 Cintaku di Rumah Susun (1987) (actor)
 Kerikil-Kerikil Tajam (1987) (actor)
 Nagabonar (1987) (actor)
 Kejarlah Daku Kau Kutangkap (1986) (actor)
 Arie Hanggara (1986) (actor)
 Menumpas Teroris (1986) (actor)
 Sunan Kalijaga & Syech Siti Jenar (1985) (actor)
 Hati yang Perawan (1984) (actor)
 Sunan Kalijaga (1984) (actor)

Awards and nominations

Dramas
 Hikayat Pengembara (TV Series on Ramadan)
 Lorong Waktu  seasons 1-6 (1999–2006, as H. Husin)
 Demi Masa
 Kiamat Sudah Dekat
 Para Pencari Tuhan seasons 1-15 (2007–2017, 2019–present) (actor & producer)

References

External links

 Profil di situs web Tokoh Indonesia

1955 births
Betawi people
Bugis people
Indo people
Indonesian male film actors
Indonesian film directors
Indonesian male television actors
Indonesian people of Dutch descent
Living people
Indonesian Muslims
Vice Governors of West Java